Pitcairnia bifrons is a species of bromeliad found in Guadeloupe.

References

External links
 
 

bifrons